József Horváth (25 September 1890 – 23 February 1945), nicknamed Flamó, was a Hungarian footballer.

Career
Horváth played for Budapesti TC, in which they finished third in the Nemzeti Bajnokság I twice, in 1908–09 and 1912–13. He also played in both matches against MTK Budapest FC in the 1909–10 Magyar Kupa.

He made his debut for Hungary, aged 15 years 6 months and 7 days. He managed to play six matches for Hungary scoring five goals, all of them against Bohemia.

However, Horváth was forced to retire early due to lower back problems.

References

External links
 

1890 births
1945 deaths
Footballers from Budapest
Hungarian footballers
Hungary international footballers
Budapesti TC players
Association football forwards